Sir John Lethieullier (1633, London – 4 January 1719, Lewisham) was a British merchant and businessman descended from Huguenots from the Spanish Netherlands. His parents were John le Thieullier and Jane de la Forterie or Delafort, born in Frankfurt and Brabant respectively. He was the eldest of their three sons. His father had moved to England in 1605.

He settled initially in Ilford and then in Lewisham. He began by buying English textiles from East Anglia and the west of England with his business partner Charles Marescoe (husband to John's sister Leonora), superintending their dyeing and finishing and then exporting them to the Levant and southern Europe. He soon diversified and by 1669 was exporting tin and lead to Rotterdam and Venice as well as importing Portuguese sugar and Dutch iron. He became sheriff of London in 1675 and in 1693 bought Aldersbrook Manor in what is now east London. He is buried in the churchyard of St Alfege Church in Greenwich.

He married Anne Hooker at St Clement's, Eastcheap on 18 May 1659. Their son John was the father of the antiquarian Smart Lethieullier.

References 

English knights
1633 births
1719 deaths
English people of Belgian descent
Sheriffs of the City of London
17th-century English businesspeople
18th-century English businesspeople